ADAM10 endopeptidase (Kuzbanian protein, myelin-associated disintegrin metalloproteinase) is an enzyme. This enzyme catalyses the following chemical reaction

 Endopeptidase of broad specificity

This enzyme belongs to the peptidase family M12.

References

External links 
 

EC 3.4.24